The 1989–90 Hellenic Football League season was the 37th in the history of the Hellenic Football League, a football competition in England.

Premier Division

The Premier Division featured 14 clubs which competed in the division last season, along with four new clubs:
Almondsbury Picksons, promoted from Division One
Headington Amateurs, promoted from Division One
Newport, reformed club after Newport County folded
Ruislip Park, joined after Ruislip from the Southern Football League left the league.

Also, Penhill changed name to Swindon Athletic.

League table

Division One

Division One featured 13 clubs which competed in the division last season, along with three new clubs:
Milton United, joined from the North Berks League
Viking Sports, relegated from the Premier Division
Wallingford Town, relegated from the Premier Division

League table

References

External links
 Hellenic Football League

1989-90
8